Los Angeles Children's Chorus (LACC) is a children's choral youth organisation based in Los Angeles. LACC has appeared in more than 300 performances with such organizations as the Los Angeles Opera, Los Angeles Philharmonic, Los Angeles Master Chorale, Hollywood Bowl Orchestra, and Los Angeles Chamber Orchestra.

Since its founding in 1986, LACC has educated more than 2,200 young singers. It includes over 400 choristers divided into seven ensembles and two introductory programs, from more than 60 communities across the greater Los Angeles area. Members rehearse once or twice weekly, with weekly musicianship classes and regular performances with the Chorus.

Repertoire covers a spectrum of musical genres including established classical works, art songs, American jazz pieces and spirituals, and arrangements of folk songs from around the world.

About
Los Angeles Children's Chorus was founded by Rebecca Thompson in 1986. It has office and rehearsal space in Pasadena Presbyterian Church.

LACC has performed with the Los Angeles Philharmonic in such works as Mahler's Third Symphony, Orff's Carmina Burana, Adams’ El Niño, Mendelssohn's Midsummer Night's Dream, Stravinsky's Persephone, and Bernstein's Mass under conductors Esa-Pekka Salonen, André Previn, and Marin Alsop. The choir sings with the Los Angeles Master Chorale under Grant Gershon and with the Hollywood Bowl Orchestra under the direction of John Mauceri and Leonard Slatkin. In 2011, Concert Choir performed in the premiere of world-renowned conductor, Esa-Pekka Salonen's, composition of Dona Nobis Pacem at the Walt Disney Concert Hall in LA. LACC also performs on occasion with the Pasadena Symphony, the Los Angeles Chamber Orchestra, and Southwest Chamber Music Orchestra.

In addition to their contracted performances, LACC presents its own annual Winter and Spring Concerts. The Chorus performs compositions that range from established works by classical composers to contemporary arrangements of folk songs from around the world. The Chorus presents new compositions written specifically for children's voices. Works performed by LACC's Concert Choir include Britten's Missa Brevis and Ceremony of Carols, Faure's Messe Basse, and Dancing Day by John Rutter. In June 2000, LACC produced its first children's opera, Benjamin Britten’s Noye's Fludde (Noah's Flood). Eighty choristers joined with the Orchestra da Camera of the Colburn School and three adult singer/actors.

In July 2007, LACC produced a new choral opera written for LACC by composer Peter Ash and librettist Donald Sturrock, Keepers of the Night. Conductor Grant Gershon, director Corey Madden and soloists Suzanna Guzmán, Malcolm MacKenzie, Lynette Tapia and Lauren Libaw joined 65 LACC choristers for four performances of the world premiere production at the Alex Theatre in Glendale.

On August 1, 2018, Fernando Malvar-Ruiz replaced Anne Tomlinson as artistic director after her 22-year tenure came to an end.

In response to the COVID-19 pandemic, LACC established virtual choir rehearsals and produced their first online concert, titled E pluribus unum (English: From many, one) in December 2020. The choir has since returned to rehearsing and performing in physical venues with safety protocols in place.

Choirs & Programs 
The Los Angeles Children's Chorus is made up of two introductory programs and seven ensembles, each designed for a specific level of musical experience. Choristers are promoted from one ensemble to the next after acquiring the required skills through the musicianship program.

First Experiences in Singing 
Prior to admission into Preparatory Choir, children ages 6–8 may participate in a two-level beginner program called First Experiences in Singing (FES). Level I of the program introduces children to solfège, pitch, rhythm, the music staff, the use of head voice, and more. Level II builds upon the content introduced in Level I, adding the Bel canto technique, basic dictation, vocal exercises, tempos, and more.

First Experiences in Choral Singing 
Following FES is First Experiences in Choral Singing (FECS). This introductory ensemble is designed for children who have possess the skills taught in FES, but who aren't ready for Preparatory Choir. It primarily encourages listening skills and development of the upper vocal range, and addresses other skills like reading octavos and recognizing musical phrasing, too.

Preparatory Choir 
The youngest performing ensemble is the Preparatory Choir, directed by Mandy Brigham, which serves young children with little to no music experience. Though Preparatory Choir does not perform with LACC's other ensembles, it still hosts two concerts each season for choristers' family members.

Apprentice Choir 
Choristers in Apprentice Choir, which is directed by Eric Lifland, may be promoted from Preparatory Choir or may audition. As such, this ensemble caters to choristers with basic music experience. Apprentice Choir performs with the higher-level ensembles at the Winter and Spring concerts, along with occasional performances at community events.

Intermediate Choir 
Intermediate Choir, directed by Mandy Brigham, accepts auditions or promotions from Apprentice Choir. This ensemble introduces choristers to more advanced pieces, along with the opportunity to perform with professional musical organizations including the Los Angeles Philharmonic and Los Angeles Opera. Intermediate Choir performs with the other ensembles twice each season, in addition to community events, special concerts, and its own annual spring tour.

Concert Choir 
Concert Choir, directed by Fernando Malvar-Ruiz), is the largest ensemble in LACC. Choristers have attained a high degree of professionalism and musical skill, which opens opportunities to perform with prominent music organizations like the Hollywood Bowl Orchestra, Los Angeles Master Chorale, Los Angeles Philharmonic, Los Angeles Opera, MUSE/IQUE, and more throughout each season. Concert Choir alternates between an international tour and a domestic tour each summer.

Young Men's Ensemble 
The Young Men's Ensemble (YME) is composed of male singers whose voices are transitioning. The ensemble, directed by Dr. Steven Kronauer, accepts singers from Apprentice Choir, Intermediate Choir, Concert Choir, or through audition. Choristers work with Dr. Kronauer during separate vocal coaching sessions to enhance techniques that promote healthy singing throughout their vocal transition. YME alternate between touring domestically and internationally each summer.

Chamber Singers 
The Chamber Singers are also directed by Fernando Malvar-Ruiz. This ensemble of 16–18 female choristers is invitation-only, chosen from members of the Concert Choir who have completed all 7 levels of musicianship lessons. Chamber Singers have the opportunity to perform with artists like the Calder Quartet, Anna Christy, and Grant Gershon.

Chorale 
LACC's final ensemble is Chorale, a mixed voices choir directed by Fernando Malvar-Ruiz. Choristers from Concert Choir and the Young Men's Ensemble with a high degree of musical ability are invited to audition for Chorale, which performs a large variety of pieces designed specifically for mixed voice ensembles.

Musicianship Classes 
Starting in Preparatory Choir, choristers receive weekly musicianship lessons. These classes, which are separated into eight skill-based levels, incorporate the Kodály Method and teach how to read sheet music and identify rhythms, keys, scales, dynamics, and more. The highest levels improve upon sight singing skills and introduce basic conducting.

Tours
LACC's Concert Choir and Young Men's Ensemble tour across the United States and worldwide, alternating between national and international tours each year. In previous seasons, Concert Choir toured Italy, Brazil, Austria, Hungary, Poland, the Czech Republic, Great Britain, Canada, and Australia. National tours have included Boston, New York, New Jersey, Washington DC, Alaska, Colorado, Chicago, and Indianapolis. In summer 2006, Concert Choir was the featured choir at the Tuscany International Children's Chorus Festival. In Summer 2008, Concert Choir toured to China for the first time prior to the 2008 Beijing Olympics. In Summer 2010, they traveled for the first time to Finland, Sweden, and Estonia. In Summer 2012, the members of Concert Choir traveled to South Africa, the first season to do so. In Summer 2016, the Concert Choir Touring Ensemble traveled to Japan.

Chorus members have performed at events during visits to Los Angeles by the Emperor and Empress of Japan, Great Britain's Prime Minister Margaret Thatcher, Israeli Prime Minister Yitzhak Rabin, and on nationally televised commercials, movie soundtracks, the Grammy Awards Show, and The Tonight Show. They performed at the opening of the Cathedral of Our Lady of the Angels in downtown Los Angeles and sang at LA City Hall for the first anniversary of 9/11. LACC was named “2003 Artists of the Year” by the Los Angeles Opera League.

LACC holds an all-choir retreat in the autumn, with time dedicated for workshops, combined rehearsals, individual rehearsals, and recreation. Intermediate Choir takes a weekend tour every spring, traveling to cities throughout the western United States to visit and perform with many other children's choirs. Apprentice Choir and Preparatory Choir enjoy a day trip in the spring to visit and perform with other children's choirs.

Notable performances

Operas 
Keepers of the Night (World Premiere)(2007)
Hansel and Gretel (2006)
Grendel (World Premiere)(2006)
Parsifal (2005)
Der Rosenkavalier (2005)
Carmen (2004)
La Boheme (2004)
Fantastic Mr. Fox (World Premiere) (1998)

Other Performances
Mahler's Eighth Symphony with the LA Philharmonic (2008)
Rouse's Requiem (2007)
Mahler's Third Symphony with the LA Philharmonic (2006)
John Adams' El Niño (2005)
Carl Orff's Carmina Burana (2005)
Lord of the Rings choral music at the Hollywood Bowl (2004)

Film and Television
Sing!, a 2001 Academy Award-nominated documentary about the Los Angeles Children's Chorus, directed by Freida Lee Mock.
PBS Great Performances - John Williams (2015)

LA Opera
LACC has appeared in productions and world premieres with LA Opera, including: La damnation de Faust, Die Frau ohne Schatten, Billy Budd, La Bohème, Pagliacci, Tosca, Midsummer Night's Dream, Otello, Carmen, Hansel and Gretel, Der Rosenkavalier, Queen of Spades, Werther, Turandot, and the world premieres of Grendel and the children's opera Fantastic Mr. Fox.

Hosting
Los Angeles Children's Chorus occasionally hosts visits from, and performs with, other children's choirs, including the Leningrad Children's Choir, Toronto Children's Chorus, Tapiola Choir of Finland, Dawn Children's Choir of Moscow, Carmina Slovenica of Maribor, Slovenia, Australian Girls Choir, American Boychoir, The Phoenix Boys Choir, Phoenix Girls Chorus, Central California Children's Choir, Lawrence Children's Choir, Portland Symphonic Girlchoir, Pensacola Children's Chorus, Hamburg Girl's Choir, and more.

News Articles
Looseleaf, Victoria. "Classical Music Raising Kids' Voices." Los Angeles Times February 22, 2004, E44.

External links
LACC Website

References

Choirs of children
Music of Los Angeles
Musical groups established in 1986
1986 establishments in California
Choirs in California
Culture of Pasadena, California